The Icelandic Women's Handball Cup (Icelandic: Bikarkeppni kvenna í handknattleik), also known as Coca-Cola Cup since 2013 for sponsorship reasons, is an annual handball competition between clubs in Iceland. It is run by the Icelandic Handball Association.

The current champions are KA/Þór who won their 1st title on 2 October 2021.

Title holders 
 2015 Grótta
 2016 Stjarnan
 2017 Stjarnan
 2018 Fram
 2019 Valur
 2021 KA/Þór

Titles 

Source

References

External links
 Icelandic Handball Association 

Handball competitions in Iceland